The 2020 International Swimming League was the second edition of the International Swimming League, a professional swimming league, established in 2019. It comprised ten teams composed of both women and men. The league, due to COVID-19 pandemic travel restrictions, consisted of thirteen short course swimming meets which took place in the city of Budapest, Hungary.

 The US-based Cali Condors won the Grand Final, with Caeleb Dressel winning the season MVP award.

Schedule

The schedule consisted of ten regular-season meets, followed by two Semifinals and a Final Match in Budapest.

Events schedule
A total of 37 races were held in each match (the 4 × 50 m mixed medley relay acted as a tie breaker).

International Swimming League
Swimming competitions in Hungary
International sports competitions in Budapest
International Swimming League
International Swimming League
International Swimming League
International Swimming League